A gubernatorial election was held on 28 August 2022 to elect the next governor of , a prefecture of Japan located in the north of the island of Shikoku.

Keizo Hamada, the incumbent governor since 2010 and a former Finance Ministry bureaucrat, is not seeking reelection.

Candidates 

Toyohito Ikeda, backed by the LDP, Komeito, SDP and DPFP.
Nakatani Koichi, backed by the JCP.

Results

References 

2022 elections in Japan
Kagawa gubernational elections
Politics of Kagawa Prefecture